The United Democratic Front (Juba Arabic: جبهة الديمقراطية المتحدة Jabhet Al-Dimoqratiyet Al-Mutahedat) is a political party in South Sudan. It is led by Peter Abdurahman Sule. The party is represented in the Interim National Assembly of Sudan and the South Sudan Legislative Assembly, where it holds four seats.

The United Democratic Front (UDF) party was founded in 2002 by Peter Abdulrahman Sule. It has been the main opposition party in the country since the Republic of South Sudan achieved its independence in 2011. It remains the second-largest political party in the country after the Sudan People's Liberation Movement (SPLM), the country's ruling party since 2005.

In 2011, the SPLM government arrested Sule. He remained in detention for two years without trial. In October 2013, he was released through a presidential amnesty issued by H.E Salva Kiir Mayardit the president of the Republic of South Sudan. When conflict erupted in December 2013, an accord known as the Agreement on the Resolution of Conflict in the Republic of South Sudan (ARCSS), 2015 was signed between SPLM-IO, GRSS, Former Detainees (FDs) and other political parties. This agreement did not hold long and the country return to war again in July 2016

During negotiations of 2014-2015, UDF party submitted through email to the IGAD special envoy, its position on how the conflict in the country could be resolved. The government responded by confiscating the passport of the party's chairman. He was not allowed to travel to Addis Ababa to attend peace negotiations. The document put Sule's life in danger, as both the government and the main opposition (SPLM-IO) were unhappy about it.

In February 2014, Sule appointed Bona Deng Lawrence as his deputy and relieve and dismissed Sebastian Uchan Kiech from his position as deputy chairman. These changes came due to Uchan's weak leadership. This was proved when Uchan went into hidings in 2011, immediately after chairman Sule was arrested.

after his relieve from the position of deputy chairman, He illegally declared himself a parallel chairman of the party. This act harmed party reputation and negatively affected party focus and performance in national issues. On 31 December 2014, Sule fled to Uganda, seeking political asylum, which was granted to him and his family members.

In July 2015, news of his assassination was all over EAC and international media houses as well as social media. UDF, under the leadership of Lawrence, participated in the 2018 peace negotiations in both Addis Ababa, Ethiopia, and Khartoum, Sudan. These negotiations resulted in the signing of the Revitalized Agreement on Resolution of Conflict in the Republic of South Sudan (R-ARCSS) in September 2018.

Notable people
 

Duoth Koang Rueh Wour, South Sudanese politician

References

External links
Sudan Electionnaire

Political parties in South Sudan
Liberal parties in Africa
Political parties established in 2008
Organisations based in Juba